The War Mothers Memorial Bridge is a box girder bridge that carries US 60 and KY 420 across the Kentucky River in Frankfort, Kentucky. The bridge carries approximately 12,900 cars per day as of 2009. The bridge was built in 1938. At some point, US 60 was shifted from the Singing Bridge just downstream to the War Mothers Memorial Bridge. This bridge connects Frankfort to the Kentucky State Capitol.

See also
 
 
 
 List of crossings of the Kentucky River

U.S. Route 60
Bridges of the United States Numbered Highway System
Road bridges in Kentucky
Transportation in Franklin County, Kentucky
Buildings and structures in Frankfort, Kentucky
Bridges completed in 1938
Bridges over the Kentucky River
1938 establishments in Kentucky
Box girder bridges in the United States